Ilıpınar is a quarter of the town Atkaracalar, Atkaracalar District, Çankırı Province, Turkey. Its population is 144 (2021).

References

Populated places in Atkaracalar District